Anteosaurinae is an extinct subfamily of dinocephalian therapsids. It is one of two subfamilies in the family Anteosauridae, the other being Syodontinae.

Description

These are very specialized, very large anteosaurs. The postcanine teeth are further reduced. Deepening of the postorbital region of the skull (behind the eyes) produced a larger temporal opening, indicating more muscle mass. The boss on the angular (rear of the jaw) has become very prominent, again, another sign of powerful jaw muscles. These huge animals were clearly formidable predators.

In the Anteosaurinae, pachyostosis is taken to extremes. The dorsal (upper) surface of the nasal, frontal, and postfrontals (around and between/above the eyes) is thickened and rugose in the same manner as the tapinocephalids. Nevertheless these animals are too specialized and too late in time to have been the ancestors of the herbivorous tapinocephalids, so these characteristics evolved independently.

Boonstra notes that the hip joint and the femur of Anteosaurus is comparable with those of the crocodile and that these animals may have had a crawling habit.  In view of the carnivorous dentition, he believes them to have been slinking predators.

Classification
Below is a cladogram showing syodontine relationships from a 2012 phylogenetic study of anteosaurians:

References

External links
 Anteosauridae at Palaeos

Anteosaurs
Guadalupian first appearances
Guadalupian extinctions
Prehistoric animal subfamilies